The 26th TVyNovelas Awards, is an Academy of special awards to the best of soap operas and TV shows. The awards ceremony took place on April 27, 2008 in the Forum Mundo Imperial, Acapulco, Guerrero. The ceremony was televised in the Mexico by Canal de las estrellas.

Yuri hosted the show. Destilando Amor won 10 awards including Best Telenovela of the Year, the most for the evening. Other winners Pasión and Lola, érase una vez won 2 awards.

Summary of awards and nominations

Winners and nominees

Novelas

Others

Special Awards
Special Recognition for his Artistic Career: Joaquín Cordero
Special Award for Teletón México: Fernando Landeros

Performers

Missing
People who did not attend ceremony wing and were nominated in the shortlist in each category:
 Carla Estrada
 Eugenio Derbez (Accepted the award his position Luis Manuel Ávila, Bárbara Torres and Miguel Pérez)
 Isela Vega
 María Zarattini

References 

TVyNovelas Awards
TVyNovelas Awards
TVyNovelas Awards
TVyNovelas Awards ceremonies